Ronnie Self (July 5, 1938 – August 28, 1981) was an American rockabilly singer and songwriter. His solo career was unsuccessful, despite being signed to contracts with Columbia and then Decca from the late 1950s through the early 1960s. His only charted single was "Bop-A-Lena"; recorded in 1957 and released in 1958, it reached No. 68 on the Billboard charts. His boastful country anthem "Ain't I'm a Dog" was a regional hit in the South, but failed to score nationally. It reached #31 in Australia and Bop-A-Lena #25.

A talented performer and songwriter, Self's career was blighted by his severe alcoholism and erratic behavior, including incidents of violence. However, Brenda Lee's recordings of his songs "I'm Sorry", "Sweet Nothin's", and "Everybody Loves Me But You" became major pop classics. His country gospel song "Ain't That Beautiful Singing", recorded by Jake Hess, was awarded a Grammy Award for Best Sacred Performance in 1969. He also wrote Brenda Lee's 1963 No. 28 UK hit single "Sweet Impossible You" (the B-side to "The Grass is Greener" in the United States). 

He died in Springfield, Missouri, in 1981 aged 43.

References

American rock singers
American rockabilly musicians
Norton Records artists
1938 births
1981 deaths
20th-century American singers